The following is a list of radio frequency connector types.

Standard types

Standard-sized 

 4.3-10 connector, a new proprietary connector not to be confused with DIN 4.3/10 one
 Belling-Lee connector, also called IEC 61169-2 connector, used throughout Europe and Australia for domestic television and FM radio antenna cabling
 BNC connector (Bayonet Neill Neill-Concelman). (IEC 61169-8 and IEC 61169-63)
 C-type connector (Concelman)
 Dezifix connector, hermaphrodite connector used mainly by Rohde & Schwarz
 DIN 7/16 connector (DIN 47223 and IEC 61169-4), a high-power 50 Ω connector originally developed by Spinner
 F-type connector, used for domestic television installations and domestic satellite LNBs (75 Ω) worldwide with the exception of Europe and Australia
 GR connector (officially the General Radio Type 874)
 LC/LT connector, a high voltage connector originally developed by the US Navy
 Motorola connector, standard AM/FM antenna connector used for automotive radios
 Musa connector, a 50 Ω connector used in telecommunications and broadcast video
 N connector "Type N" (Neill) 50 Ω or 75 Ω characteristic impedance connector (IEC 61169-16)
 NMO mount connector (new Motorola mount), removable mobile antenna connector uses a  mounting hole and has a large base with a 1 1/8" – 18 tpi thread for attaching the antenna.
 SC connector, screw version of C connector [not to be confused with the fiber optic connector of the same name]
 SR connector (from Russian: Cоединитель Pадиочастотный) is a Russian RF connector, based on the BNC connector and which comes in a 50 Ω and 75 Ω versions
 TNC connector (threaded Neill-Concelman)
 Twin-BNC (Twinax) Twinax connectors are used with 78 Ω or 95 Ω conductor cables and operate from 0–200 MHz.  Due to improved shielding characteristics, these connectors are used in balanced low level and high sensitivity circuits.  They feature keyway polarization to ensure system integrity and prevent signals from being mixed, making them ideal for computer network applications.  Other popular applications include broadband, military and instrumentation.  The 2 stud bayonet clamp design allows quick and easy coupling without requiring special tools. 
 UHF connector (e.g., PL-259/SO-239). Some Japanese manufacturers such as Diamond Antennas use an M-type clone which has the measures and thread translated to metric.

Miniature-sized 
 AFI connector
 DIN 1.0/2.3 (DIN 47297), used for miniaturized 50 and 75 Ω coaxial modules in data- and telecommunications equipment which can have a threaded, or a push-pull lock coupling mechanism. 
 DIN 1.6/5.6 (DIN 47295), a 75 Ω connector, used for similar purposes as DIN 1.0/2.3
 DIN 4.1/9.5
 DIN 4.3/10 (IEC 61169-54)
 FME connector
 G-type connector
 HD-BNC connector
 HSD connector, circular connector (not coaxial) used in the automotive industry
 LEMO 00 connector, a proprietary push-pull 50 Ω coaxial connector
 MCX connector
 Microdot S-50 series connector, a proprietary 50 Ω coaxial connector
 Mini-BNC connector
 Mini-UHF connector, a smaller and much newer design than the standard UHF
 SMA connector A 50 ohm screwed connection. The 0.9mm centre pin is the same diameter as the centre of RG402 Coax so that connections to that cable can be made with no discontinuity, forming the pin from the coax itself. Good to 18 GHz
 RP-SMA connector, used in SOHO wireless networks and similar ISM band devices. 
  Air cored Microwave connectors The name of a connector (e.g. 1.85) is determined by the diameter in mm of the air dielectric around the centre pin
 3.5 and 2.92 mm (sometimes called K) connectors, which also have a 0.9mm centre pin and cross-mate with SMA and offer higher maximum frequency
 2.4, 1.85 (sometimes called V) externally similar to SMA but have metric threads and a smaller pin, and do not cross-mate with SMA. The 0.5mm centre pin is the same diameter as the centre of RG405 Coax so that connections can be made with no discontinuity, forming the pin from the coax itself.
 1.35 mm connectors, for applications to circa 90 GHz
 1.0 mm (sometimes called W) connectors, for applications to circa 110 GHz
 SMB connector
 FAKRA connector is a modified SMB connector with a keyed and colour coded plastic housing and latch, used in the automotive industry
 SMC connector
 SSMA connector is a 50 Ohm nominal impedance RF connector which utilizes a 10–36 threaded coupling and is essentially a scaled down version of the SMA.  They are characterized by compactness, high frequency bandwidth, and highly reliable mechanical performance.  The male contact was designed to be the same size as the cable conductor so that it could be used as the mating pin for optimized VSWR.  Common applications included Mil-Aero, telecommunications, RFID, antennas, test and measurement and radar systems.
 SMZ connector – System 43 (BT43 and High Density HD43) for use in DDF. This is a 75 ohm impedance RF connector, and is ideal for instrumentation applications.

Micro-sized 
 HFM connector (High-Speed FAKRA-Mini), used in the automotive industry
 Hirose U.FL connector; aka Amphenol AMC, I-PEX MHF
 Hirose W.FL connector; aka Amphenol AMMC, I-PEX MHF3
 IMP connector
 Mini-SMB connector This is a 75 Ohm RF connector which provides broadband capability through 2 GHz.  Its snap-on design offers a quick connect/disconnect.  It features a reduced housing allowing circuit miniaturization and efficient use of space.  They are available for several cable types as well as for PCB through hole, surface mount and end launch applications from several manufacturers, including Amphenol RF. 
 MMCX connector
 MMS connector
 MMT connector
 PSMP connector
 SSMB connector This is a 50 Ohm connector which is a small version of the standard SMB connector.  They provide excellent electrical performance in a micro miniature footprint.  The snap-on mating interface allows quick installation and dense packaging.  Common applications include military, instrumentation, PC/LAN and wireless.  
 SSMC connector Are ideal for limited-space applications that require the security of a threaded coupling mechanism.  They are best used with semi-rigid cables or miniature flexible cables in demanding applications up to 12.4 GHz
 UMP connector

Precision types 
 APC-7 connector

Flanged types 
 EIA RF Connectors series of flanged connectors, normally used in high power broadcast transmission sites with rigid lines

Quick-lock types 

 HPQN connector
 Mini Quick connector
 QLS connector
 QMA and QN connector
 Mini-QMA connector
 WQMA connector (Waterproof QMA)
 SnapN connector

High-voltage types 
 HN connector, a high voltage version of the N connector
 MHV connector, a coaxial connector designed for high voltages
 SHV connector, a safer coaxial connector designed for high voltages

Blind-mate types 

 BMA (OSP) connector
 BMMA (OSSP) connector
 BMZ connector
 BZ connector
 SMP (GPO) connector
 SMPM (GPPO) connector
 SMPS (G3PO) connector

Audio and video types 
The following audio and video connectors are sometimes used for RF, but are not generally considered to be RF connectors:
 Concentric twinax connector
 DIN connector (not to be confused with "7/16 DIN" or "DIN 1.0/2.3" connectors)
 Multimedia extension connectors (MXC) are based on the 8-pin Mini-DIN connector
 RCA connector (Radio Corporation of America, also "Cinch connector") was originally introduced for audio, but is now widely used for video as well
 SCART

See also 

 RF connector
 :Category:Coaxial connectors
 Flanged connector
 Optical fiber connector

References

External links 

 RF connectors for upper frequencies
 Common Coaxial Connectors

 
Television terminology